Loren Taylor (born July 1977) is an American politician who served on the Oakland City Council from 2019 to 2023. A Democrat, He represented the 6th district, which includes the East Oakland neighborhoods of Maxwell Park, Millsmont, Havenscourt and Eastmont. He was a candidate in the 2022 Oakland Mayoral Election narrowly losing by 0.6% to fellow city councilmember Sheng Thao.

Early life and education 
Taylor was born in Oakland, California, in 1977. A third-generation Oaklander, he spent his childhood in Oakland and went to high school at The College Preparatory School, graduating in 1995.

Taylor later earned a bachelor of arts from Case Western Reserve University and a master of science in biomedical engineering from the University of Connecticut. He later earned a master of business administration from the University of California, Berkeley.

Engineering and business career 
Taylor worked as a biomedical engineer and management consultant for businesses and nonprofit organizations. His community involvement included serving as a board member of the 100 Black Men of the Bay Area and the West Oakland Health Center.

Political career 
Taylor first ran for public office in 2018 and defeated 16-year incumbent Desley Brooks and three other candidates earning 64.3% of the vote after 5 rounds of ranked choice voting.

Taylor's stated priorities during the election were (1) creating economic opportunities in East Oakland, (2) stop the pushing out / pricing out of Oaklanders, and (3) making government more effective and efficient. Among Taylor's proposals to make government more effective was civilianizing certain police jobs and strengthening the existing Neighborhood Crime Prevention Councils

Policy and legislation

Homelessness 
 In response to the 68% increase in Oakland's unhoused population, and the explosion of encampments in the city, Taylor partnered with other Councilmembers to enact the Permanent Access to Housing (PATH) plan that seeks to close the racial disparities of homelessness with a multipronged approach around (1) prevention, (2) crisis response, (3) transitional housing, and (4) long-term supportive & affordable housing. 
 Taylor voted for the creation of a new homeless encampment management policy that would designate high and low sensitivity areas.  The homeless would be allowed to camp in low sensitivity areas.  The measure was approved in October 2020 by unanimous consent of the city council.
 Taylor worked with the Black Cultural Zone, a community development corporation consisting of 20 Oakland nonprofits, to establish the Akoma Outdoor Market one of several programs it runs on a city owned lot in East Oakland.

Public safety 
 Taylor coauthored a resolution creating a Reimagining Public Safety Task Force charged with developing the plan to defund the Oakland Police Department by 50% and reallocate those funds to alternative public safety and crime prevention services.
 Taylor coauthored a resolution that placed a measure on Oakland's November 2020 ballot to strengthen the Police Commission by retaining its autonomy and independence including during public safety emergencies.

Personal life 

Taylor lives in East Oakland with his wife, Dr. Erica Taylor, with whom he has two children. He has served as PTA president, soccer coach, and Boy Scout leader.

References

External links 
 Loren Taylor's Official City Council Webpage
 News coverage of Loren Taylor in the Mercury News
 Loren Taylor on NPR's Forum with Michael Krasny (talk show host) discussing Oakland's 2020 homeless encampment management policy

1977 births
21st-century American politicians
American biomedical engineers
Democratic Party San Francisco Bay Area politicians
Case Western Reserve University alumni
Haas School of Business alumni
Living people
Oakland City Council members
University of Connecticut alumni
African-American city council members in California